Simion Bughici (b. Simon David, December 14, 1914 – February 1, 1997) was a Romanian communist politician who served as the Minister of Foreign Affairs of Romania.

Life and career
Bughici was born in Iași to a Jewish family of klezmer musicians; his father and two brothers perished during the June 1941 Iași pogrom. He joined the banned Communist Party of Romania in 1933. During World War II, Bughici was imprisoned at Vapniarka concentration camp in Transnistria. He served as an Ambassador of Romania to Soviet Union in 1949–1952. In July 1952, he was appointed Minister of Foreign Affairs of Romania, replacing Ana Pauker, who was sacked by the communist leadership aided by Joseph Stalin. The appointment of Bughici disassociated Pauker's downfall from the anti-Semitism widely seen in Eastern Europe at the time. Bughici served as minister until October 1955. During his political career, he also served as the Vice Prime Minister of Romania.

Other offices that he held were that of head of Centrocoop, Minister of the Food Industry and vice president of the Communist Party Control Commission (Colegiul Central de Partid) (1969-1974).

He was married to Ana Friedman, a history teacher and school principal.

See also
Romanian Communist Party
Foreign relations of Romania

References

1914 births
1997 deaths
Politicians from Iași
Moldavian Jews
Jewish Romanian politicians
Romanian Communist Party politicians
Romanian Ministers of Foreign Affairs
Deputy Prime Ministers of Romania
Heads of Centrocoop
Ambassadors of Romania to the Soviet Union
Survivors of World War II deportations to Transnistria